Igors Labuts (born 7 June 1990), is a Latvian footballer who currently plays as a goalkeeper for the Latvian First League club FC New Project.

Club career
Born in Daugavpils, Labuts career started in Ditton Daugavpils, being a member of the youth system since 2002. After five years, in 2007, at the age of 16, he was invited to join the Latvian Higher League newcomers Blāzma Rēzekne. Initially, he was the club's third-choice keeper, later that season he became the second choice. Labuts made his debut for Blāzma on 8 November 2008 in a 2-2 draw against Vindava Ventspils for the Latvian First League. 

In summer of 2009 Labuts moved abroad, joining the League of Ireland Premier Division club Sporting Fingal. After six months, with the Irish club unable to pay the requested transfer fee for a further stay, Labuts returned to Latvia.

In January 2010, he joined the Latvian First League club FB Gulbene, helping them win the league and earn a promotion to the Latvian Higher League for the 2011 season. For the next two seasons Labuts played in the top tier of Latvian football, but after Gulbene's relegation in 2012, he switched clubs and moved to the incumbent Latvian champions Daugava Daugavpils at the beginning of 2013. Serving as a back-up keeper for half a season, Labuts was loaned out to Ilūkstes NSS in July 2013 in order to retain playing practice.

Before the start of the 2014 season, Labuts joined the Latvian Higher League club FC Jūrmala. After the club was struck by financial problems, he was let go and eventually ended up in Portugal, joining the Portuguese Segunda Liga club Atlético CP. On 9 August 2014 Labuts made his professional debut with Atlético in a Segunda Liga match against Freamunde.

In September 2017 the FAI banned Labuts and teammate Dragos Sfrijan for 12 months after a UEFA investigation found "clear and overwhelming betting evidence" of fixing of Athlone's 29 April match against Longford Town in the 2017 League of Ireland First Division.  The Professional Footballers' Association of Ireland said the decision was based on "half-baked innuendo". Labuts' appeal against his suspension was rejected in October 2018.

Labuts moved to Latvia's First League to FC New Project in 2019.

International career
Labuts was a member of Latvia U-17, Latvia U-18 and Latvia U-19 football teams, but has not been called up to the senior side yet.

Honours
FB Gulbene
 Latvian First League (1): 2010

Personal life
Aside from his own professional footballer's career Labuts also works at the Just4Keepers International Goalkeeper Academy as a youth coach for aspiring keepers in Latvia. While playing in Latvia, Labuts was also studying at the Latvian Sports Academy, acquiring a bachelor's degree in Sports Science.

References

External links

1990 births
Living people
Sportspeople from Daugavpils
Latvian footballers
Match fixers
Association football goalkeepers
SK Blāzma players
Sporting Fingal F.C. players
Latvian expatriate footballers
Latvian expatriate sportspeople in Ireland
Expatriate association footballers in the Republic of Ireland
League of Ireland players
FB Gulbene players
FC Daugava players
FC Jūrmala players
FK Spartaks Jūrmala players
Atlético Clube de Portugal players
Liga Portugal 2 players
Latvian expatriate sportspeople in Portugal
Expatriate footballers in Portugal
Ilūkstes NSS players